The following is the complete filmography of American actress, Jennifer Garner.

Film

Television

Theatre

Video games

References

External links
 

Garner, Jennifer
Garner, Jennifer